Purge is the first EP released by the industrial alternative rock band Econoline Crush. It was released in Canada in 1994 by EMI, and it garnered them a nomination for a Juno Award. "Pssyche" is a Killing Joke cover, the original being the B-side to the "Wardance" single released in 1980. An alternate demo version of the EP was released in 1993, with different versions of songs and slight lineup changes.

Track listing

Track listing (1993 demo)

Personnel
 Trevor Hurst – vocals
 Robbie Morfitt – guitar
 Dan Yaremko – bass
 Tom Ferris – keyboards, programming (1993 version only)
 Chris Meyers – drums, keyboards (1993 version only)
 Gregg Leask – drums (1994 version only)
 Hack – guitar (1994 version only)
 Rhys Fulber – keyboards (1994 version only)

References

Econoline Crush albums
1994 EPs